HMS Skipjack was the French naval schooner Trimeuse, commissioned at Guadeloupe in 1805. The Royal Navy captured her in 1806 and took her into service. She was paid off in 1808 and was used as a breakwater in 1809.

Tremeuse
On 12 March , after a chase of 15 hours, captured the French Navy schooner Trimeuse (or Tremeuse, or Tremieuse), armed with two 9-pounder carronades and one long 6-pounder; she had a crew of 53 men and was from Guadeloupe. She had been out 12 days without capturing anything. The Royal Navy took Trimeuse into service as Skipjack.

British service and fate
Lieutenant Samuel Malbon commissioned Skipjack on 14 March 1806. She was paid off on 17 January 1808. A year later, on 7 January 1809, she was a breakwater at Demerara.

Citations and references
Citations

References
  
 

Schooners of the French Navy
Captured ships
Schooners of the Royal Navy
Ships sunk as breakwaters